Montenegro competed at the 2012 Summer Paralympics in London, United Kingdom, where it was represented by a single athlete - Marijana Goranović.

Athletics 

Women’s Field Events

See also

 Montenegro at the 2012 Summer Olympics

References

Nations at the 2012 Summer Paralympics
2012
2012 in Montenegrin sport